The 2023 World Seniors Darts Championship (known for sponsorship reasons as the 2023 JENNINGSbet World Seniors Darts Championship) was the second World Seniors Darts Championship organised by the World Seniors Darts Tour. It took place at the Circus Tavern in Purfleet between 9 and 12 February 2023. The event was open to players over the age of 50, except current PDC Tour Card holders. The tournament was expanded from 24 to 32 players.

Robert Thornton, the defending champion after winning the 2022 inaugural tournament, successfully defended his title to become back to back World Senior Champion.

Prize money
The prize fund for the event was £80,000, with £30,000 going to the champion.

Qualifiers
The first players announced to take part in the event were Robert Thornton, Phil Taylor, Martin Adams, John Part, Trina Gulliver and Keith Deller.

Three more invited players were announced in October, Mark Dudbridge, Co Stompé and Chris Mason. Mason previously stated that he would rather qualify by the open qualifications, but after an impressive start in the MODUS Super Series tournaments, he accepted his spot as an invited player.

In early November, five more players were announced. The group of competitors has been enlarged by Roland Scholten, Peter Manley, Terry Jenkins, Ronnie Baxter and Les Wallace. Glen Durrant received an invitation to take part in this tournament after his official retirement from a professional career.

More contestants were announced in December. The invitation to participate in the tournament was accepted by Bob Anderson, Larry Butler, David Cameron, Neil Duff, Kevin Painter, Tony O'Shea and Darryl Fitton. Two days later, the seed list was announced.

Seeded players
  (Champion)
  (Quarter-finals)
  (Second round)
  (First round)
  (First round)
  (Second round)
  (First round)
  (Quarter-finals)
  (Second round)
  (First round)
  (First round)
  (Semi-finals)
  (Second round)
  (First round)
  (First round)
  (First round)

Invited players
  (First round)
  (Quarter-finals)
  (Quarter-finals)
  (Semi-finals)
  (First round)
  (Second round) 
  (First round)
  (First round)

Qualifiers
  (First round)
  (Second round)
  (Runner-up)

World Seniors Tour ranking qualifiers
  (Second round)
  (First round)
  (First round)
  (First round)
  (Second round)

Draw

Statistics

Top averages
This table shows the highest averages achieved by players throughout the tournament.

Representation
This table shows the number of players by country in the 2023 World Seniors Darts Championship. A total of seven nationalities were represented.

References

World Seniors Darts Championship
World Seniors Darts Championship
World Seniors Darts Championship
Senior sports competitions